The Supercar scare was a national controversy that arose in Australia in 1972 in regard to the sale to the public of high performance "homologation special" versions of Australian-built passenger cars.

The reason
Despite the popular belief of the performance motoring public of the time that focuses solely on Evan Greens 25 July 1972 headline article on proposed Australian ‘SuperCars’ – in fact the controversy had started many years previously in 1967 , as Evan Greens article was released and printed barely a week before the very last and final announcements were made by the relevant companies and Authorities, ending all ‘SuperCar’ programs. Public complaints and government minister concerns had originally started before the Ford XR GT was even officially released in 1967 , and this can be evidenced by multiple articles printed in the various mainstream Australian newspapers. A good example would be the concerns noted by Clyde Hodgins in a 26 March 1967 article for the Sydney Morning Herald , proclaiming a 115mph Falcon was coming soon and more concerns were accelerated even further when the AGE newspaper ran a story covering the "soon to be released" , 120mph GT Falcon – on 15 April 1967. These are only two of a large range of articles that cover the publics concerns over the high performance ‘Super-Fast’ or ‘Super-Cars" that would appear in the Australian mainstream papers alongside headlines that also proclaimed the publics concern over the excessively high – and fast growing road death toll that Australia also had at the time.

Soon , on 24 July 1969 - the same day that the Ford GTHO Phase 1 "Super-Car" was publicly announced in the mainstream papers – The N.S.W. Transport  Minister is quoted as opening the annual conference of the Motor Trades – and then taking the Motor trade to task – for its "irresponsible promotion of speed". Threats from the government minister and the state premier were publicly recorded in the mainstream papers as threatening the car manufactures that they may be excluded from any eligibility for any government contracts - if the manufacturers continued to make and sell to the public any car considered a ‘SuperCar’ or another similar considerations – and that was mid 1969. For 5 November 1970, the AGE newspaper, reported on a government appointed committee to probe the nationally recorded 3383 deaths on Australian roads in 1969 and by 1970 , the road toll was to be the highest amount of deaths on Australian roads ever seen, with The Age newspaper on 6 October 1970 reporting the NSW road toll was 977 deaths in the state of NSW alone and the year was yet unfinished. 

As 1972 arrived and the car companies either announced or hinted at their latest and fastest – soon to be arriving ‘SuperCars’ – and unrelated to Evan Greens story less then a week before – The governing body of motor sport in Australia – the Confederation of Australian Motorsport – would on the Thursday 20 June 1972 , buckle under pressure and announce with minimal ceremony - the actual deletion of the ‘Series-Production’ car race category that had given birth to the Australian SuperCars. Giving all the so called "Showroom Race Cars – or Super Cars" – literally no race category to run in, anywhere in Australia, and so, the cars had become irrlevent overnight. 

Multiple papers quietly reported on the CAMS announcement and papers like the Canberra Times , on the next day (30 June 1972) would publicly report on the CAMS decision and the actually deletion of the race category that the "SuperCars" had once so successfully raced in. Knowing that there was no official category for their production ‘SuperCars’ to race in anymore – General Motors Holden’s , also on the same Friday , 30 July 1972 – would publicly announce in the mainstream papers that they had cancelled all their plans to produce and release their new semi secret 145 mph V8 Torana ‘SuperCar’ , codenamed the XV-1 , that was destined for the 1972 Bathurst race. Again this was announced and printed in multiple mainstream newspapers and this can easily be found in The AGE newspaper on 30 June 1972, which carries one of the many articles mentioning this landmark GM-H decision. As it was the start of the weekend, Ford and Chrysler held weekend crisis meetings on Saturday 1 June 1972 and for Ford , also into the Sunday 2 June 1972 – with eventually both Chrysler and Ford on the Monday 3 July 1972 also publicly announcing their immediate abandonment of their ‘Showroom-SuperCar’ programs , as like their competitor, GM-H -  the cars no longer had a race category to compete in, after the CAMS decision to delete the entire race category.

As a direct result of the apparent (to the public) - sudden end to all SuperCar production for the start of July in 1972 , yet only a bare week after the lone article by Evan Green was printed as a headline in a single paper in one state of Australia  – and despite the fact that the problems and public concerns over such cars and the ever growing road toll had been well recorded in multiple mainstream papers, by different journalists as far back as 1967. Evan Green was to be come the unfair focus for a problem – and ultimate solution that had actually been growing steadily since 1967.

In late 1971, well prior to the Evan Green article being published in Sydney in mid 1972 , a magazine had shown a Ford Falcon GTHO Phase III being driven (legally) at over 225 km/h (140 mph) on a Victorian public highway.[4]  at the time , Victoria had no maximum speed limit, so there was technically no fault in this as long as the drivers were driving safely in the eyes of the police. But concerns about potential public and government backlash shown by the publishers at the high , but not illegal speed of the car on the open highway in 1971 – saw the magazine photo actually altered to show a more publicly acceptable speed of slightly over 100 mph.

The cars

While testing the prototype Torana V8 in a Sports Sedan race at Bathurst during the Easter weekend in 1972, Holden Dealer Team (HDT) boss Harry Firth calculated that the car, driven by regular HDT driver Colin Bond, reached  on the 2 km long Conrod Straight. He also noted that the V8 was a regular road car engine (with minimal modifications) and not a blueprinted race engine. Firth ran the car in Sports Sedans (fitted with front and rear spoilers) in a successful attempt to disguise that the V8 Torana was intended to be raced in the Bathurst 500 later in the year. Firth also had team mechanic/driver Larry Perkins drive the Torana from Melbourne to Bathurst with instructions to "Go as fast as you can", with Firth in his hotted up Holden Monaro secretly following Perkins the entire way, and noting that the Torana was getting away from Firth while he was doing . The entire journey to Bathurst was completed in a mere 4 hours and 33 minutes, a record that stands to this day. The team also ran their regular six-cylinder car in the Series Production races that weekend, giving Firth a valuable guide in how much faster the V8 engined car was compared to the six (the V8 lapped over 5 seconds faster), and how it would compare to the V8 powered Ford XY Falcon GTHO Phase 3's. The V8 Torana was not only faster than the Phase 3's, but around 5 seconds per lap faster than the team's 6cyl XU-1 Torana driven by Peter Brock. The XW7 308 V8 Engine for the XW7 V8 LJ Torana was a 300HP 308 Engine and was not the Standard 240HP 308 V8 Engine.

Chrysler Australia tested V8-powered Valiants that "went like Hell" according to Ian (Pete) Geoghegan. Similarly powered vehicles in the United States were winning many races in the Trans-Am series. Two VH Valiant Chargers with 340ci engines, 4-speed manual transmissions, and heavy duty Chrysler-built rear axles were sighted briefly in a Melbourne dealership only days prior to the publishing of Evan Green's article; this pair had "disappeared" by the very next morning (Monday 26th).

Government reaction
The article quoted New South Wales Transport Minister Milton Morris as saying that he was appalled at these cars - which he labelled "bullets on wheels" - being sold to ordinary motorists and that "if manufacturers are making these supercars available to the general public because this is a condition of eligibility for the Bathurst 500, then I think it is imperative that race organisers closely examine their rules." Green went on to say that the models would introduce new standards of handling and control in Australian high performance cars and he quoted HDT boss Harry Firth as saying that the proposed Torana V8 model would be "the best handling, safest car on the road."

While Firth was insistent that the V8 XU-1 handled better than the six-cylinder version, HDT driver Peter Brock, who also raced the HDT Beast LC Torana Sports Sedan that had an F5000 V8 Engine fitted, later claimed that while the V8 was a lot faster in a straight line, its handling was terrible. Brock reported that in testing, the first time both he and Colin Bond gave the car full acceleration, it broke the windscreen due to the V8's much greater torque.

On the following Wednesday, Morris said he would "seek a national ban on such cars" and the following day the Queensland Minister of Transport, Mr Hooper joined in calling for a "national ban on the registration of popular make high-performance cars capable of speeds in excess of 130 mph". In another announcement on that Thursday, Mr D Thomson, secretary of the Confederation of Australian Motor Sport, stated that regulations would be changed to discontinue all "series production car" races and allow manufacturers to race specially modified race vehicles derived from a production vehicle. Thomson also said  that the Bathurst 500 "had created large problems, one of the greatest of which was the marketing of the 'super-cars'".

The Backdown
On Friday, 30 June 1972, a spokesman for General Motors-Holden's announced that the company had abandoned its plans to build and race a V8 powered Torana "because of concern expressed by government leaders". On the same day a spokesman for the Ford Motor Company stated that "We are considering the situation" and a spokesman for Chrysler Australia Ltd claimed that "The Charger R/T is not a super-car". The following day Ford announced that it would not continue with production of its new GTHO and that the company would seek government guidelines for the production of performance cars.

On the same day, Chrysler said that it had abandoned development of a V8 competition version of the Charger R/T and that it would "withdraw from "direct participation" in series production racing, including the Bathurst 500". Chrysler also reported that the V8 Charger was not intended for the 1972 Hardie-Ferodo 500, though Chrysler factory backed racing brothers Leo and Ian Geoghegan did test a ute fitted with a 5.6 litre (340 cui) V8 engine and with the R/T Charger's wheelbase at the Mallala circuit in South Australia. The Geoghegan's reported that while faster on the straights, the extra weight of the V8 gave the car severe understeer and required earlier brake points due to the brakes being the same size as those on the six-cylinder Hemi Chargers (the Geoghegan's reports on the V8 Chrysler). As a result, lap times in testing were around two to three seconds slower than when the car was fitted with the lighter Hemi six, though it was expected that the long straights and more open nature of the Mount Panorama Circuit would better suit the more powerful V8 engine car. Pete Geoghegan also road tested the V8 ute on the country roads surrounding the town of Mallala and reported that while the top speed was a vast improvement over the Hemi-6, the extra weight of the V8 did not stop the front of the car feeling 'light' at high speeds.

While there was government outrage that the "Big Three" were to produce such supercars for public sale in Australia, it was pointed out that those who could afford to do so could still buy high powered imported sports cars such as those made by Ferrari, Porsche and Jaguar that came with performance capabilities that rivaled or surpassed the proposed Australian cars. While these cars were somewhat more expensive to buy in Australia, it was argued that drivers had as much chance of having a fatal accident in a high powered import as they did in an Australian-made car.

The aftermath

Following the shelving of the so-called "Supercars", the 1972 Hardie-Ferodo 500 went ahead under Series Production rules. The race was won by Peter Brock in a six cylinder LJ Torana GTR XU-1 for Firth's Holden Dealer Team. The following year, CAMS introduced the Group C touring car rules which would last until the end of 1984. The Bathurst 500 was also increased from 500 miles to 1000 kilometres from 1973.

Evan Green, the journalist/racer who started the Supercar Scare, was also a television motorsport commentator for Channel 7 in Sydney, which broadcast Bathurst 1000. For many years after 1972, Green was shunned or given short answers by HDT boss Harry Firth, whose team had carried out all the development of the V8 Torana. Firth also claimed that he personally lost some A$55,000 of his own money on the cars, HDT Yellow LC XU1 V8 prototype was converted back to a 6cyl and sold off by GMH, the Lone o Ranger (Orange) LJ GTR V8 prototype was converted back to a 6cyl in late 1974 and tendered off by GMH in Feb 1975 after running a 308 V8 for 18 months. The pink and white LJ GTR 308 V8's were sold off. The orange prototype was stolen from its private owner in Nov 1985 and has never been found. The pink LJ GTR prototype was found in 2012. This was also true of factory Ford driver Allan Moffat who had been heavily involved in the testing and development of the Phase IV Falcon (four were built and three are known to survive as of 2020). While Firth later claimed that Green was "no friend of mine" following the Supercar scare, Moffat softened his stance over the years and allowed Green to interview him both in the pits and also in his Melbourne workshop.

Unlike Ford and Holden, Chrysler Australia chose to pull out of racing after 1972 (Ford also did after 1973, but returned in 1976). Chrysler introduced both the 5.3L and 5.6L V8 engines to its luxury sedans, though both were heavily de-tuned. Ford continued to produce its V8 powered Ford Falcon GT range until the GT was discontinued after the Ford XB Falcon, though the Falcon continued with the V8 until Ford pulled the plug on it in 1983. Although the 5.0L V8 was already part of the larger Monaro and Kingswood range, Holden introduced the V8 to the Torana range in 1974 with the Holden LH Torana SLR/5000.

References

Motorsport in Australia
Auto racing controversies